Jesse Jantzen is the founder of Skylar James Capital, a multi-strategy familt office.  Previously Jesse was a portfolio manager at Clearview Capital Management and held positions at Perella Weinberg Partners and W Holding Company LLC and as an assistant coach for Harvard University. Jesse currently sits on the board of the fetal center for the Children’s Hospital of Philadelphia (CHOP) and the Beat the Streets (BTS) organization.

Jesse received an A.B from Harvard University in 2004. He was a three-time All-American and 2004 National Champion and Outstanding Wrestler award winner. In 2005 Jesse won a World Championship at the University World Games in Izmir, Turkey in Freestyle wrestling at 66 kg. Jesse participated in the Real Pro Wrestling league representing the New York Outrage. He is the most decorated Harvard Wrestler in history and was a 2004 Bingham Award winner for Harvard’s best athlete. Some detractors suggested that because of his reliance on mat wrestling, he would not fare well in freestyle, which focuses on takedowns. Jantzen developed a series of moves on top known as the “Jantzen Ride.” Career record at Harvard 132-13, 3 time All American (1st, 3rd, 3rd). Jesse competed in the 2008 Olympic Trials but fell short of his goal of making the Beijing Olympics. Jesse is a member of the Harvard Varsity Club Hall of Fame, EIWA Conference Hall of Fame and Suffolk County Hall of fame.

Jesse has had involvement with several Film/TV projects (Foxcatcher, Dixieland, The Knick, Team Foxcatcher) as an actor, producer, financier and stunt coordinator. He was acknowledged in Variety magazine for his work in Foxcatcher. Movie critic, Justin Chang, applauded Jantzen’s choreographed wrestling scenes as “superbly convincing”.

He was a graduate of Shoreham Wading River High School.  He was the first 4x State Champion and 6x state place winner in New York State wrestling history. He was a 3x High School All-American and 2x National Champion/Outstanding Wrestler award winner. In 2000, he was the Asics High School Wrestler of the Year. Jesse was inducted into the Suffolk Sports Hall of Fame on Long Island in the Wrestling Category with the Class of 2011.

Jesse lives and works in downtown Manhattan. Jantzen is one of five children. His younger brother, Corey, was also an accomplished wrestler for Harvard University and Shoreham Wading River High School. Corey worked with Jesse on both Foxcatcher and Dixieland, where he had credited roles in each film.

References

External links

Living people
American male sport wrestlers
Harvard Crimson wrestlers
American film producers
1982 births
Universiade medalists in wrestling
Universiade gold medalists for the United States
Medalists at the 2005 Summer Universiade